Alfredo Pea (born 17 November 1954) is an Italian stage, film and television actor.

Life and career 
Born in Rome, Pea studied acting at the  "Studio di arti sceniche" drama school by Alessandro Fersen. He became first known in the mid-seventies thanks to a series of commedia sexy all'italiana films, in which he played the typical role of a shy teenager seduced by more experienced women. In the same period he started appearing, in secondary roles, in more ambitious art films, working with Giuliano Montaldo, Mario Monicelli, Marco Tullio Giordana and Giuseppe Ferrara, among others. From the late 1970s he is also active on television, in TV-movies and series of good success such as Il Capo dei Capi.

Selected filmography
 The Visitor (1974) 
 Classe mista (1975) 
 The School Teacher (1975)
 And Agnes Chose to Die   (1976)
 The Two Orphans (1976)
 La dottoressa del distretto militare (1976)
 Closed Circuit (1978)
 To Love the Damned (1980)
 Control (1987)
 Weird Tales (1994)
 Oasi (1994)
 State Secret (1995)

References

External links 

1954 births
Male actors from Rome
Italian male stage actors
Italian male film actors
Italian male television actors
20th-century Italian male actors
Living people